sushi is a file previewer for the GNOME desktop environment. It is available as a standalone package that integrates with GNOME Files (formerly named Nautilus).

History and functionality
sushi was first introduced in GNOME Shell 3.2. Its sole purpose is the ability to preview files in Nautilus, which can be invoked by hitting the spacebar while selecting a file. sushi's abilities extend from the GStreamer framework, enabling the playback of all content which GStreamer supports, by default and through plugins. In addition to media formats, sushi supports previewing of most plain-text documents, including scripts (with syntax highlighting), as well as HTML documents, PDF files, and SVG files.

See also
 gThumb – image viewer and image organizer software with editing capabilities
 Quick Look
 List of GNOME applications

References

External links
 https://git.gnome.org/browse/sushi/tree/

GNOME Applications
Graphics software that uses GTK